Yassin Ayoub (born 6 March 1994) is a professional footballer who plays as a midfielder for Eredivisie club Excelsior. Born in Morocco, he represented the Netherlands at youth level.

Club career
In January 2018, Ayoub signed a contract until 2022 with Feyenoord, effective 1 July 2018.

On 22 January 2020, he signed a contract with Panathinaikos, running until the summer of 2023.

On 22 July 2022, Ayoub signed a two-year contract with Excelsior.

International career
Ayoub won the 2011 UEFA European Under-17 Championship with Netherlands U-17 after being diagnosed with heart problems.

Career statistics

Honours
Feyenoord
Johan Cruijff Shield: 2018

Panathinaikos
Greek Cup: 2021–22

References

External links

 
 Voetbal International profile 
 Netherlands Youth stats at OnsOranje

1994 births
Living people
People from Al Hoceima
Dutch sportspeople of Moroccan descent
Association football midfielders
Dutch footballers
Moroccan footballers
ASV De Dijk players
HFC Haarlem players
AFC Ajax players
FC Utrecht players
Panathinaikos F.C. players
Feyenoord players
Excelsior Rotterdam players
Eredivisie players
Super League Greece players
Netherlands youth international footballers
Netherlands under-21 international footballers
Moroccan expatriate footballers
Dutch expatriate footballers
Expatriate footballers in Greece
Moroccan expatriate sportspeople in Greece
Dutch expatriate sportspeople in Greece